Solodky, Solodki, Solodkyy, Solodkiy, Solodkyi, feminine: Solodka, Solodkaya is a Ukrainian-language surname literally meaning "sweet". Notable people with the surname include:

Natalya Solodkaya , Russian footballer

Ukrainian-language surnames